Did you mean: Oud?
UOD may mean:

Unión Obrera Democrática Filipina, Philippines
University of Delhi, India
University of Derby, England
University of Durham, England
University of Dublin, Republic of Ireland
University of Dundee, Scotland
University of Dammam, Saudi Arabi
Universe of Discourse
Uniform of the Day